"I've Got a New Heartache" is a song recorded by American country music artist Ray Price.  It was released in November 1956 as the first single from his Greatest Hits compilation album.  The song reached #2 on the Billboard Hot Country Singles chart.

Chart performance

Ricky Skaggs version

The song was also recorded by American country music artist Ricky Skaggs.  It was released in May 1986 as the third single from the album Live in London.  The song reached #10 on the Billboard Hot Country Singles chart.

Chart performance

References

1956 singles
1986 singles
1956 songs
Ray Price (musician) songs
Ricky Skaggs songs
Song recordings produced by Ricky Skaggs
Columbia Records singles
Epic Records singles
Songs written by Wayne Walker (songwriter)